The 2005 Hindu Kush earthquake hit northeastern Afghanistan with a magnitude of 6.5 on December 12 at 21:47 (UTC). According to the United States Geological Survey's ShakeMap and Did You Feel It? products, the maximum Mercalli intensity was V (Moderate) at Chitral. Five people were killed in the Hindu Kush region and landslides blocked several roads near Bagh, Kashmir. The earthquake occurred some 65 miles away from Faizabad, a city in the Hindu Kush mountains, but it could be felt in many neighboring areas.  It could even be felt about 200 miles away in Islamabad, Pakistan. The quake was strong enough to trigger panic among survivors of October's devastating earthquake, who came out from their makeshift shelters in freezing temperatures. Although magnitude-6 earthquakes typically cause severe damage, this quake caused relatively little due to the fact that it occurred deep underground.

See also
 List of earthquakes in 2005
 List of earthquakes in Afghanistan

References

Sources
 
 .
 
 .

External links
 M6.5 - Hindu Kush region, Afghanistan – United States Geological Survey
 

2005 earthquakes
2005 in Afghanistan
December 2005 events in Asia
Earthquakes in Afghanistan
Earthquakes in Pakistan
History of Afghanistan (1992–present)
2005 earthqauke

2005 disasters in Asia 
2005 disasters in Pakistan
2005 in Pakistan